The Lepidoptera of Serbia and Montenegro consist of both the butterflies and moths recorded from Serbia and Montenegro.

Butterflies

Hesperiidae
Carcharodus alceae (Esper, 1780)
Carcharodus floccifera (Zeller, 1847)
Carcharodus lavatherae (Esper, 1783)
Carterocephalus palaemon (Pallas, 1771)
Erynnis tages (Linnaeus, 1758)
Gegenes nostrodamus (Fabricius, 1793)
Gegenes pumilio (Hoffmannsegg, 1804)
Hesperia comma (Linnaeus, 1758)
Heteropterus morpheus (Pallas, 1771)
Muschampia proto (Ochsenheimer, 1808)
Ochlodes sylvanus (Esper, 1777)
Pyrgus alveus (Hübner, 1803)
Pyrgus andromedae (Wallengren, 1853)
Pyrgus armoricanus (Oberthur, 1910)
Pyrgus carthami (Hübner, 1813)
Pyrgus malvae (Linnaeus, 1758)
Pyrgus serratulae (Rambur, 1839)
Pyrgus sidae (Esper, 1784)
Spialia orbifer (Hübner, 1823)
Thymelicus acteon (Rottemburg, 1775)
Thymelicus lineola (Ochsenheimer, 1808)
Thymelicus sylvestris (Poda, 1761)

Lycaenidae
Agriades optilete (Knoch, 1781)
Aricia agestis (Denis & Schiffermuller, 1775)
Aricia anteros (Freyer, 1838)
Aricia artaxerxes (Fabricius, 1793)
Cacyreus marshalli Butler, 1897
Callophrys rubi (Linnaeus, 1758)
Celastrina argiolus (Linnaeus, 1758)
Cupido minimus (Fuessly, 1775)
Cupido osiris (Meigen, 1829)
Cupido alcetas (Hoffmannsegg, 1804)
Cupido argiades (Pallas, 1771)
Cupido decolorata (Staudinger, 1886)
Cyaniris semiargus (Rottemburg, 1775)
Eumedonia eumedon (Esper, 1780)
Favonius quercus (Linnaeus, 1758)
Glaucopsyche alexis (Poda, 1761)
Iolana iolas (Ochsenheimer, 1816)
Kretania sephirus (Frivaldszky, 1835)
Lampides boeticus (Linnaeus, 1767)
Leptotes pirithous (Linnaeus, 1767)
Lycaena alciphron (Rottemburg, 1775)
Lycaena candens (Herrich-Schäffer, 1844)
Lycaena dispar (Haworth, 1802)
Lycaena hippothoe (Linnaeus, 1761)
Lycaena ottomanus (Lefebvre, 1830)
Lycaena phlaeas (Linnaeus, 1761)
Lycaena thersamon (Esper, 1784)
Lycaena tityrus (Poda, 1761)
Lycaena virgaureae (Linnaeus, 1758)
Lysandra bellargus (Rottemburg, 1775)
Lysandra coridon (Poda, 1761)
Phengaris alcon (Denis & Schiffermuller, 1775)
Phengaris arion (Linnaeus, 1758)
Plebejus argus (Linnaeus, 1758)
Plebejus argyrognomon (Bergstrasser, 1779)
Plebejus idas (Linnaeus, 1761)
Polyommatus admetus (Esper, 1783)
Polyommatus damon (Denis & Schiffermuller, 1775)
Polyommatus ripartii (Freyer, 1830)
Polyommatus daphnis (Denis & Schiffermuller, 1775)
Polyommatus amandus (Schneider, 1792)
Polyommatus dorylas (Denis & Schiffermuller, 1775)
Polyommatus eros (Ochsenheimer, 1808)
Polyommatus escheri (Hübner, 1823)
Polyommatus icarus (Rottemburg, 1775)
Polyommatus thersites (Cantener, 1835)
Pseudophilotes bavius (Eversmann, 1832)
Pseudophilotes vicrama (Moore, 1865)
Satyrium acaciae (Fabricius, 1787)
Satyrium ilicis (Esper, 1779)
Satyrium pruni (Linnaeus, 1758)
Satyrium spini (Denis & Schiffermuller, 1775)
Satyrium w-album (Knoch, 1782)
Scolitantides orion (Pallas, 1771)
Tarucus balkanica (Freyer, 1844)
Thecla betulae (Linnaeus, 1758)

Nymphalidae
Aglais io (Linnaeus, 1758)
Aglais urticae (Linnaeus, 1758)
Apatura ilia (Denis & Schiffermuller, 1775)
Apatura iris (Linnaeus, 1758)
Apatura metis (Freyer, 1829)
Aphantopus hyperantus (Linnaeus, 1758)
Araschnia levana (Linnaeus, 1758)
Arethusana arethusa (Denis & Schiffermuller, 1775)
Argynnis paphia (Linnaeus, 1758)
Argynnis pandora (Denis & Schiffermuller, 1775)
Boloria graeca (Staudinger, 1870)
Boloria pales (Denis & Schiffermuller, 1775)
Boloria dia (Linnaeus, 1767)
Boloria euphrosyne (Linnaeus, 1758)
Boloria selene (Denis & Schiffermuller, 1775)
Boloria titania (Esper, 1793)
Brenthis daphne (Bergstrasser, 1780)
Brenthis hecate (Denis & Schiffermuller, 1775)
Brenthis ino (Rottemburg, 1775)
Brintesia circe (Fabricius, 1775)
Charaxes jasius (Linnaeus, 1767)
Chazara briseis (Linnaeus, 1764)
Coenonympha arcania (Linnaeus, 1761)
Coenonympha glycerion (Borkhausen, 1788)
Coenonympha leander (Esper, 1784)
Coenonympha orientalis (Rebel, 1910)
Coenonympha pamphilus (Linnaeus, 1758)
Coenonympha rhodopensis Elwes, 1900
Coenonympha tullia (Muller, 1764)
Erebia aethiops (Esper, 1777)
Erebia cassioides (Reiner & Hochenwarth, 1792)
Erebia epiphron (Knoch, 1783)
Erebia euryale (Esper, 1805)
Erebia gorge (Hübner, 1804)
Erebia ligea (Linnaeus, 1758)
Erebia medusa (Denis & Schiffermuller, 1775)
Erebia melas (Herbst, 1796)
Erebia oeme (Hübner, 1804)
Erebia ottomana Herrich-Schäffer, 1847
Erebia pandrose (Borkhausen, 1788)
Erebia pronoe (Esper, 1780)
Erebia rhodopensis Nicholl, 1900
Erebia triarius (de Prunner, 1798)
Euphydryas aurinia (Rottemburg, 1775)
Euphydryas maturna (Linnaeus, 1758)
Fabriciana adippe (Denis & Schiffermuller, 1775)
Fabriciana niobe (Linnaeus, 1758)
Hipparchia fagi (Scopoli, 1763)
Hipparchia syriaca (Staudinger, 1871)
Hipparchia fatua Freyer, 1844
Hipparchia statilinus (Hufnagel, 1766)
Hipparchia semele (Linnaeus, 1758)
Hipparchia volgensis (Mazochin-Porshnjakov, 1952)
Hyponephele lupinus (O. Costa, 1836)
Hyponephele lycaon (Rottemburg, 1775)
Issoria lathonia (Linnaeus, 1758)
Kirinia climene (Esper, 1783)
Kirinia roxelana (Cramer, 1777)
Lasiommata maera (Linnaeus, 1758)
Lasiommata megera (Linnaeus, 1767)
Lasiommata petropolitana (Fabricius, 1787)
Libythea celtis (Laicharting, 1782)
Limenitis camilla (Linnaeus, 1764)
Limenitis populi (Linnaeus, 1758)
Limenitis reducta Staudinger, 1901
Lopinga achine (Scopoli, 1763)
Maniola jurtina (Linnaeus, 1758)
Melanargia galathea (Linnaeus, 1758)
Melanargia larissa (Geyer, 1828)
Melitaea athalia (Rottemburg, 1775)
Melitaea aurelia Nickerl, 1850
Melitaea cinxia (Linnaeus, 1758)
Melitaea diamina (Lang, 1789)
Melitaea didyma (Esper, 1778)
Melitaea phoebe (Denis & Schiffermuller, 1775)
Melitaea trivia (Denis & Schiffermuller, 1775)
Minois dryas (Scopoli, 1763)
Neptis rivularis (Scopoli, 1763)
Neptis sappho (Pallas, 1771)
Nymphalis antiopa (Linnaeus, 1758)
Nymphalis polychloros (Linnaeus, 1758)
Nymphalis vaualbum (Denis & Schiffermuller, 1775)
Nymphalis xanthomelas (Esper, 1781)
Pararge aegeria (Linnaeus, 1758)
Polygonia c-album (Linnaeus, 1758)
Polygonia egea (Cramer, 1775)
Pseudochazara anthelea (Hübner, 1824)
Pyronia cecilia (Vallantin, 1894)
Pyronia tithonus (Linnaeus, 1767)
Satyrus ferula (Fabricius, 1793)
Speyeria aglaja (Linnaeus, 1758)
Vanessa atalanta (Linnaeus, 1758)
Vanessa cardui (Linnaeus, 1758)

Papilionidae
Iphiclides podalirius (Linnaeus, 1758)
Papilio alexanor Esper, 1800
Papilio machaon Linnaeus, 1758
Parnassius apollo (Linnaeus, 1758)
Parnassius mnemosyne (Linnaeus, 1758)
Zerynthia cerisy (Godart, 1824)
Zerynthia polyxena (Denis & Schiffermuller, 1775)

Pieridae
Anthocharis cardamines (Linnaeus, 1758)
Aporia crataegi (Linnaeus, 1758)
Colias alfacariensis Ribbe, 1905
Colias caucasica Staudinger, 1871
Colias croceus (Fourcroy, 1785)
Colias erate (Esper, 1805)
Colias hyale (Linnaeus, 1758)
Colias myrmidone (Esper, 1781)
Euchloe ausonia (Hübner, 1804)
Gonepteryx cleopatra (Linnaeus, 1767)
Gonepteryx farinosa (Zeller, 1847)
Gonepteryx rhamni (Linnaeus, 1758)
Leptidea morsei (Fenton, 1882)
Leptidea sinapis (Linnaeus, 1758)
Pieris balcana Lorkovic, 1970
Pieris brassicae (Linnaeus, 1758)
Pieris ergane (Geyer, 1828)
Pieris mannii (Mayer, 1851)
Pieris napi (Linnaeus, 1758)
Pieris rapae (Linnaeus, 1758)
Pontia edusa (Fabricius, 1777)

Riodinidae
Hamearis lucina (Linnaeus, 1758)

Moths

Adelidae
Adela homalella Staudinger, 1859
Adela violella (Denis & Schiffermuller, 1775)
Cauchas rufifrontella (Treitschke, 1833)
Nematopogon adansoniella (Villers, 1789)
Nematopogon robertella (Clerck, 1759)
Nematopogon swammerdamella (Linnaeus, 1758)
Nemophora congruella (Zeller, 1839)
Nemophora degeerella (Linnaeus, 1758)
Nemophora fasciella (Fabricius, 1775)
Nemophora metallica (Poda, 1761)
Nemophora minimella (Denis & Schiffermuller, 1775)
Nemophora raddaella (Hübner, 1793)

Argyresthiidae
Argyresthia abdominalis Zeller, 1839
Argyresthia albistria (Haworth, 1828)
Argyresthia bonnetella (Linnaeus, 1758)
Argyresthia fundella (Fischer von Röslerstamm, 1835)
Argyresthia goedartella (Linnaeus, 1758)
Argyresthia pruniella (Clerck, 1759)
Argyresthia amiantella (Zeller, 1847)
Argyresthia glabratella (Zeller, 1847)

Autostichidae
Aprominta designatella (Herrich-Schäffer, 1855)
Nukusa praeditella (Rebel, 1891)
Oegoconia novimundi (Busck, 1915)

Bedelliidae
Bedellia somnulentella (Zeller, 1847)

Blastobasidae
Blastobasis phycidella (Zeller, 1839)

Brachodidae
Brachodes appendiculata (Esper, 1783)
Brachodes pumila (Ochsenheimer, 1808)

Brahmaeidae
Lemonia balcanica (Herrich-Schäffer, 1847)
Lemonia dumi (Linnaeus, 1761)
Lemonia taraxaci (Denis & Schiffermuller, 1775)

Bucculatricidae
Bucculatrix albedinella (Zeller, 1839)
Bucculatrix albella Stainton, 1867
Bucculatrix bechsteinella (Bechstein & Scharfenberg, 1805)
Bucculatrix benacicolella Hartig, 1937
Bucculatrix cantabricella Chretien, 1898
Bucculatrix cidarella (Zeller, 1839)
Bucculatrix demaryella (Duponchel, 1840)
Bucculatrix frangutella (Goeze, 1783)
Bucculatrix herbalbella Chretien, 1915
Bucculatrix infans Staudinger, 1880
Bucculatrix nigricomella (Zeller, 1839)
Bucculatrix thoracella (Thunberg, 1794)
Bucculatrix ulmella Zeller, 1848
Bucculatrix ulmifoliae M. Hering, 1931
Bucculatrix zizyphella Chrétien, 1907

Carposinidae
Carposina scirrhosella Herrich-Schäffer, 1854

Chimabachidae
Diurnea fagella (Denis & Schiffermuller, 1775)

Choreutidae
Anthophila abhasica Danilevsky, 1969
Choreutis pariana (Clerck, 1759)
Tebenna micalis (Mann, 1857)

Coleophoridae
Augasma aeratella (Zeller, 1839)
Coleophora agrianella Rebel, 1934
Coleophora alcyonipennella (Kollar, 1832)
Coleophora aleramica Baldizzone & Stubner, 2007
Coleophora astragalella Zeller, 1849
Coleophora caespititiella Zeller, 1839
Coleophora cartilaginella Christoph, 1872
Coleophora coronillae Zeller, 1849
Coleophora deauratella Lienig & Zeller, 1846
Coleophora fretella Zeller, 1847
Coleophora ibipennella Zeller, 1849
Coleophora lixella Zeller, 1849
Coleophora mayrella (Hübner, 1813)
Coleophora nubivagella Zeller, 1849
Coleophora obviella Rebel, 1914
Coleophora onopordiella Zeller, 1849
Coleophora ornatipennella (Hübner, 1796)
Coleophora sternipennella (Zetterstedt, 1839)
Coleophora trientella Christoph, 1872
Coleophora versurella Zeller, 1849
Coleophora vestianella (Linnaeus, 1758)

Cosmopterigidae
Cosmopterix zieglerella (Hübner, 1810)
Eteobalea anonymella (Riedl, 1965)
Eteobalea intermediella (Riedl, 1966)
Eteobalea isabellella (O. G. Costa, 1836)
Eteobalea serratella (Treitschke, 1833)
Limnaecia phragmitella Stainton, 1851
Pancalia leuwenhoekella (Linnaeus, 1761)
Pancalia nodosella (Bruand, 1851)
Pancalia schwarzella (Fabricius, 1798)
Pyroderces argyrogrammos (Zeller, 1847)
Vulcaniella grandiferella (Sinev, 1986)

Cossidae
Cossus cossus (Linnaeus, 1758)
Dyspessa ulula (Borkhausen, 1790)
Parahypopta caestrum (Hübner, 1808)
Phragmataecia castaneae (Hübner, 1790)
Zeuzera pyrina (Linnaeus, 1761)

Crambidae
Agriphila dalmatinellus (Hampson, 1900)
Agriphila geniculea (Haworth, 1811)
Agriphila inquinatella (Denis & Schiffermuller, 1775)
Agriphila straminella (Denis & Schiffermuller, 1775)
Agriphila tolli (Bleszynski, 1952)
Agriphila tristella (Denis & Schiffermuller, 1775)
Anania crocealis (Hübner, 1796)
Anania funebris (Strom, 1768)
Catoptria acutangulellus (Herrich-Schäffer, 1847)
Catoptria confusellus (Staudinger, 1882)
Catoptria domaviellus (Rebel, 1904)
Catoptria falsella (Denis & Schiffermuller, 1775)
Catoptria languidellus (Zeller, 1863)
Catoptria mytilella (Hübner, 1805)
Catoptria pauperellus (Treitschke, 1832)
Chrysoteuchia culmella (Linnaeus, 1758)
Chrysocrambus linetella (Fabricius, 1781)
Crambus lathoniellus (Zincken, 1817)
Crambus pascuella (Linnaeus, 1758)
Crambus perlella (Scopoli, 1763)
Crambus pratella (Linnaeus, 1758)
Crambus uliginosellus Zeller, 1850
Cydalima perspectalis (Walker, 1859)
Cynaeda dentalis (Denis & Schiffermuller, 1775)
Diasemia reticularis (Linnaeus, 1761)
Diasemiopsis ramburialis (Duponchel, 1834)
Dolicharthria punctalis (Denis & Schiffermuller, 1775)
Ecpyrrhorrhoe rubiginalis (Hübner, 1796)
Eudonia lacustrata (Panzer, 1804)
Eudonia mercurella (Linnaeus, 1758)
Eudonia petrophila (Standfuss, 1848)
Eudonia phaeoleuca (Zeller, 1846)
Evergestis aenealis (Denis & Schiffermuller, 1775)
Evergestis sophialis (Fabricius, 1787)
Hellula undalis (Fabricius, 1794)
Hydriris ornatalis (Duponchel, 1832)
Loxostege sticticalis (Linnaeus, 1761)
Mecyna flavalis (Denis & Schiffermuller, 1775)
Metasia ophialis (Treitschke, 1829)
Metasia rosealis Ragonot, 1895
Metaxmeste phrygialis (Hübner, 1796)
Nomophila noctuella (Denis & Schiffermuller, 1775)
Ostrinia nubilalis (Hübner, 1796)
Palpita vitrealis (Rossi, 1794)
Paracorsia repandalis (Denis & Schiffermuller, 1775)
Paratalanta hyalinalis (Hübner, 1796)
Pediasia contaminella (Hübner, 1796)
Pleuroptya balteata (Fabricius, 1798)
Pleuroptya ruralis (Scopoli, 1763)
Pyrausta aurata (Scopoli, 1763)
Pyrausta castalis Treitschke, 1829
Pyrausta cingulata (Linnaeus, 1758)
Pyrausta coracinalis Leraut, 1982
Pyrausta despicata (Scopoli, 1763)
Pyrausta obfuscata (Scopoli, 1763)
Pyrausta purpuralis (Linnaeus, 1758)
Pyrausta sanguinalis (Linnaeus, 1767)
Scoparia ambigualis (Treitschke, 1829)
Scoparia ingratella (Zeller, 1846)
Scoparia pyralella (Denis & Schiffermüller, 1775)
Scoparia subfusca (Haworth, 1811)
Sitochroa palealis (Denis & Schiffermüller, 1775)
Spoladea recurvalis (Fabricius, 1775)
Thisanotia chrysonuchella (Scopoli, 1763)
Udea alpinalis (Denis & Schiffermuller, 1775)
Udea decrepitalis (Herrich-Schäffer, 1848)
Udea ferrugalis (Hübner, 1796)
Udea languidalis (Eversmann, 1842)
Udea lutealis (Hübner, 1809)
Udea nebulalis (Hübner, 1796)
Udea olivalis (Denis & Schiffermuller, 1775)
Udea prunalis (Denis & Schiffermuller, 1775)
Udea rhododendronalis (Duponchel, 1834)
Udea uliginosalis (Stephens, 1834)

Douglasiidae
Tinagma perdicella Zeller, 1839

Drepanidae
Asphalia ruficollis (Denis & Schiffermuller, 1775)
Cilix glaucata (Scopoli, 1763)
Cymatophorina diluta (Denis & Schiffermuller, 1775)
Drepana falcataria (Linnaeus, 1758)
Habrosyne pyritoides (Hufnagel, 1766)
Polyploca ridens (Fabricius, 1787)
Tethea ocularis (Linnaeus, 1767)
Tethea or (Denis & Schiffermuller, 1775)
Thyatira batis (Linnaeus, 1758)
Watsonalla binaria (Hufnagel, 1767)
Watsonalla cultraria (Fabricius, 1775)
Watsonalla uncinula (Borkhausen, 1790)

Elachistidae
Agonopterix carduella (Hübner, 1817)
Agonopterix kaekeritziana (Linnaeus, 1767)
Agonopterix pallorella (Zeller, 1839)
Depressaria badiella (Hübner, 1796)
Depressaria beckmanni Heinemann, 1870
Elachista argentella (Clerck, 1759)
Haplochrois ochraceella (Rebel, 1903)
Hofmannophila pseudospretella (Stainton, 1849)
Hypercallia citrinalis (Scopoli, 1763)
Orophia sordidella (Hübner, 1796)

Endromidae
Endromis versicolora (Linnaeus, 1758)

Epermeniidae
Epermenia aequidentellus (E. Hofmann, 1867)
Epermenia insecurella (Stainton, 1854)
Ochromolopis ictella (Hübner, 1813)
Ochromolopis staintonellus (Milliere, 1869)

Erebidae
Amata kruegeri (Ragusa, 1904)
Amata phegea (Linnaeus, 1758)
Apopestes spectrum (Esper, 1787)
Arctia caja (Linnaeus, 1758)
Arctia festiva (Hufnagel, 1766)
Arctia villica (Linnaeus, 1758)
Arctornis l-nigrum (Muller, 1764)
Atolmis rubricollis (Linnaeus, 1758)
Autophila dilucida (Hübner, 1808)
Autophila limbata (Staudinger, 1871)
Autophila anaphanes Boursin, 1940
Callimorpha dominula (Linnaeus, 1758)
Calliteara pudibunda (Linnaeus, 1758)
Calymma communimacula (Denis & Schiffermuller, 1775)
Calyptra thalictri (Borkhausen, 1790)
Catephia alchymista (Denis & Schiffermuller, 1775)
Catocala coniuncta (Esper, 1787)
Catocala conversa (Esper, 1783)
Catocala dilecta (Hübner, 1808)
Catocala disjuncta (Geyer, 1828)
Catocala diversa (Geyer, 1828)
Catocala electa (Vieweg, 1790)
Catocala elocata (Esper, 1787)
Catocala fraxini (Linnaeus, 1758)
Catocala fulminea (Scopoli, 1763)
Catocala hymenaea (Denis & Schiffermuller, 1775)
Catocala lupina Herrich-Schäffer, 1851
Catocala nupta (Linnaeus, 1767)
Catocala nymphaea (Esper, 1787)
Catocala nymphagoga (Esper, 1787)
Catocala promissa (Denis & Schiffermuller, 1775)
Catocala puerpera (Giorna, 1791)
Catocala sponsa (Linnaeus, 1767)
Chelis maculosa (Gerning, 1780)
Clytie syriaca (Bugnion, 1837)
Colobochyla salicalis (Denis & Schiffermuller, 1775)
Coscinia cribraria (Linnaeus, 1758)
Coscinia striata (Linnaeus, 1758)
Cybosia mesomella (Linnaeus, 1758)
Cymbalophora pudica (Esper, 1784)
Diacrisia sannio (Linnaeus, 1758)
Diaphora luctuosa (Hübner, 1831)
Diaphora mendica (Clerck, 1759)
Diaphora sordida (Hübner, 1803)
Dicallomera fascelina (Linnaeus, 1758)
Drasteria cailino (Lefebvre, 1827)
Dysauxes ancilla (Linnaeus, 1767)
Dysauxes famula (Freyer, 1836)
Dysgonia algira (Linnaeus, 1767)
Dysgonia torrida (Guenee, 1852)
Eilema caniola (Hübner, 1808)
Eilema complana (Linnaeus, 1758)
Eilema costalis (Zeller, 1847)
Eilema depressa (Esper, 1787)
Eilema lurideola (Zincken, 1817)
Eilema lutarella (Linnaeus, 1758)
Eilema palliatella (Scopoli, 1763)
Eilema pseudocomplana (Daniel, 1939)
Eilema sororcula (Hufnagel, 1766)
Eublemma amoena (Hübner, 1803)
Eublemma himmighoffeni (Milliere, 1867)
Eublemma minutata (Fabricius, 1794)
Eublemma ostrina (Hübner, 1808)
Eublemma parva (Hübner, 1808)
Eublemma polygramma (Duponchel, 1842)
Eublemma purpurina (Denis & Schiffermuller, 1775)
Eublemma scitula (Rambur, 1833)
Eublemma viridula (Guenee, 1841)
Euclidia mi (Clerck, 1759)
Euclidia glyphica (Linnaeus, 1758)
Euclidia triquetra (Denis & Schiffermuller, 1775)
Euplagia quadripunctaria (Poda, 1761)
Euproctis chrysorrhoea (Linnaeus, 1758)
Euproctis similis (Fuessly, 1775)
Exophyla rectangularis (Geyer, 1828)
Grammodes bifasciata (Petagna, 1787)
Grammodes stolida (Fabricius, 1775)
Herminia grisealis (Denis & Schiffermuller, 1775)
Herminia tarsicrinalis (Knoch, 1782)
Herminia tarsipennalis (Treitschke, 1835)
Herminia tenuialis (Rebel, 1899)
Hypena crassalis (Fabricius, 1787)
Hypena obesalis (Treitschke, 1829)
Hypena obsitalis (Hübner, 1813)
Hypena palpalis (Hübner, 1796)
Hypena proboscidalis (Linnaeus, 1758)
Hypena rostralis (Linnaeus, 1758)
Hypenodes humidalis Doubleday, 1850
Hypenodes kalchbergi Staudinger, 1876
Hyphantria cunea (Drury, 1773)
Hyphoraia aulica (Linnaeus, 1758)
Idia calvaria (Denis & Schiffermuller, 1775)
Laelia coenosa (Hübner, 1808)
Laspeyria flexula (Denis & Schiffermuller, 1775)
Leucoma salicis (Linnaeus, 1758)
Lithosia quadra (Linnaeus, 1758)
Lygephila craccae (Denis & Schiffermuller, 1775)
Lygephila lusoria (Linnaeus, 1758)
Lygephila pastinum (Treitschke, 1826)
Lygephila procax (Hübner, 1813)
Lygephila viciae (Hübner, 1822)
Lymantria dispar (Linnaeus, 1758)
Lymantria monacha (Linnaeus, 1758)
Metachrostis dardouini (Boisduval, 1840)
Metachrostis velox (Hübner, 1813)
Miltochrista miniata (Forster, 1771)
Minucia lunaris (Denis & Schiffermuller, 1775)
Nodaria nodosalis (Herrich-Schäffer, 1851)
Nudaria mundana (Linnaeus, 1761)
Ocneria ledereri (Milliere, 1869)
Ocneria rubea (Denis & Schiffermuller, 1775)
Ocnogyna parasita (Hübner, 1790)
Odice arcuinna (Hübner, 1790)
Odice suava (Hübner, 1813)
Ophiusa tirhaca (Cramer, 1773)
Orectis proboscidata (Herrich-Schäffer, 1851)
Orgyia recens (Hübner, 1819)
Orgyia antiqua (Linnaeus, 1758)
Paracolax tristalis (Fabricius, 1794)
Parascotia fuliginaria (Linnaeus, 1761)
Parasemia plantaginis (Linnaeus, 1758)
Parocneria detrita (Esper, 1785)
Parocneria terebinthi (Freyer, 1838)
Pechipogo plumigeralis Hübner, 1825
Pechipogo strigilata (Linnaeus, 1758)
Pelosia muscerda (Hufnagel, 1766)
Penthophera morio (Linnaeus, 1767)
Phragmatobia fuliginosa (Linnaeus, 1758)
Phragmatobia luctifera (Denis & Schiffermuller, 1775)
Phragmatobia placida (Frivaldszky, 1835)
Phytometra amata (Butler, 1879)
Phytometra viridaria (Clerck, 1759)
Polypogon gryphalis (Herrich-Schäffer, 1851)
Polypogon tentacularia (Linnaeus, 1758)
Rhypagla lacernaria (Hübner, 1813)
Rhyparia purpurata (Linnaeus, 1758)
Rivula sericealis (Scopoli, 1763)
Schrankia costaestrigalis (Stephens, 1834)
Schrankia taenialis (Hübner, 1809)
Scoliopteryx libatrix (Linnaeus, 1758)
Setina irrorella (Linnaeus, 1758)
Setina roscida (Denis & Schiffermuller, 1775)
Simplicia rectalis (Eversmann, 1842)
Spilosoma lubricipeda (Linnaeus, 1758)
Spilosoma lutea (Hufnagel, 1766)
Spilosoma urticae (Esper, 1789)
Tathorhynchus exsiccata (Lederer, 1855)
Trisateles emortualis (Denis & Schiffermuller, 1775)
Tyria jacobaeae (Linnaeus, 1758)
Watsonarctia deserta (Bartel, 1902)
Zanclognatha lunalis (Scopoli, 1763)
Zanclognatha zelleralis (Wocke, 1850)
Zebeeba falsalis (Herrich-Schäffer, 1839)
Zekelita antiqualis (Hübner, 1809)
Zethes insularis Rambur, 1833

Euteliidae
Eutelia adoratrix (Staudinger, 1892)
Eutelia adulatrix (Hübner, 1813)

Gelechiidae
Acompsia cinerella (Clerck, 1759)
Acompsia tripunctella (Denis & Schiffermuller, 1775)
Altenia scriptella (Hübner, 1796)
Altenia wagneriella (Rebel, 1926)
Anarsia spartiella (Schrank, 1802)
Apodia bifractella (Duponchel, 1843)
Aproaerema anthyllidella (Hübner, 1813)
Aristotelia decurtella (Hübner, 1813)
Aroga velocella (Duponchel, 1838)
Brachmia dimidiella (Denis & Schiffermuller, 1775)
Bryotropha desertella (Douglas, 1850)
Bryotropha domestica (Haworth, 1828)
Bryotropha terrella (Denis & Schiffermuller, 1775)
Carpatolechia fugitivella (Zeller, 1839)
Caryocolum amaurella (M. Hering, 1924)
Caryocolum huebneri (Haworth, 1828)
Caryocolum leucomelanella (Zeller, 1839)
Caryocolum peregrinella (Herrich-Schäffer, 1854)
Caryocolum petryi (O. Hofmann, 1899)
Caryocolum proxima (Haworth, 1828)
Caryocolum schleichi (Christoph, 1872)
Caryocolum srnkai Huemer & Karsholt, 2011
Caryocolum tischeriella (Zeller, 1839)
Caryocolum vicinella (Douglas, 1851)
Chionodes distinctella (Zeller, 1839)
Chionodes electella (Zeller, 1839)
Chionodes fumatella (Douglas, 1850)
Chionodes nebulosella (Heinemann, 1870)
Chrysoesthia sexguttella (Thunberg, 1794)
Dichomeris alacella (Zeller, 1839)
Dichomeris juniperella (Linnaeus, 1761)
Dichomeris ustalella (Fabricius, 1794)
Eulamprotes atrella (Denis & Schiffermuller, 1775)
Eulamprotes unicolorella (Duponchel, 1843)
Exoteleia succinctella (Zeller, 1872)
Gelechia asinella (Hübner, 1796)
Gelechia dujardini (Huemer, 1991)
Gelechia scotinella Herrich-Schäffer, 1854
Gelechia sororculella (Hübner, 1817)
Helcystogramma lutatella (Herrich-Schäffer, 1854)
Helcystogramma rufescens (Haworth, 1828)
Metzneria aestivella (Zeller, 1839)
Metzneria metzneriella (Stainton, 1851)
Mirificarma eburnella (Denis & Schiffermuller, 1775)
Mirificarma flavella (Duponchel, 1844)
Mirificarma lentiginosella (Zeller, 1839)
Mirificarma maculatella (Hübner, 1796)
Neofaculta infernella (Herrich-Schäffer, 1854)
Neotelphusa sequax (Haworth, 1828)
Nothris lemniscellus (Zeller, 1839)
Nothris verbascella (Denis & Schiffermuller, 1775)
Parachronistis albiceps (Zeller, 1839)
Platyedra subcinerea (Haworth, 1828)
Prolita sexpunctella (Fabricius, 1794)
Prolita solutella (Zeller, 1839)
Pseudotelphusa tessella (Linnaeus, 1758)
Psoricoptera gibbosella (Zeller, 1839)
Sattleria dzieduszyckii (Nowicki, 1864)
Sattleria triglavica Povolný, 1987
Scrobipalpa artemisiella (Treitschke, 1833)
Scrobipalpa chrysanthemella (E. Hofmann, 1867)
Scrobipalpa obsoletella (Fischer von Röslerstamm, 1841)
Scrobipalpa ocellatella (Boyd, 1858)
Scrobipalpa vasconiella (Rossler, 1877)
Scrobipalpa voltinella (Chretien, 1898)
Scrobipalpula diffluella (Frey, 1870)
Sophronia semicostella (Hübner, 1813)
Stomopteryx remissella (Zeller, 1847)
Syncopacma cinctella (Clerck, 1759)
Syncopacma patruella (Mann, 1857)
Syncopacma taeniolella (Zeller, 1839)
Teleiodes flavimaculella (Herrich-Schäffer, 1854)
Teleiodes saltuum (Zeller, 1878)
Teleiopsis albifemorella (E. Hofmann, 1867)
Teleiopsis bagriotella (Duponchel, 1840)
Teleiopsis rosalbella (Fologne, 1862)
Thiotricha majorella (Rebel, 1910)

Geometridae
Abraxas grossulariata (Linnaeus, 1758)
Abraxas sylvata (Scopoli, 1763)
Acasis viretata (Hübner, 1799)
Agriopis bajaria (Denis & Schiffermuller, 1775)
Agriopis marginaria (Fabricius, 1776)
Alcis repandata (Linnaeus, 1758)
Alsophila aceraria (Denis & Schiffermuller, 1775)
Alsophila aescularia (Denis & Schiffermuller, 1775)
Angerona prunaria (Linnaeus, 1758)
Anticlea derivata (Denis & Schiffermuller, 1775)
Anticollix sparsata (Treitschke, 1828)
Aplasta ononaria (Fuessly, 1783)
Aplocera efformata (Guenee, 1858)
Aplocera plagiata (Linnaeus, 1758)
Aplocera praeformata (Hübner, 1826)
Aplocera simpliciata (Treitschke, 1835)
Artiora evonymaria (Denis & Schiffermuller, 1775)
Ascotis selenaria (Denis & Schiffermuller, 1775)
Asthena albulata (Hufnagel, 1767)
Biston betularia (Linnaeus, 1758)
Biston strataria (Hufnagel, 1767)
Bupalus piniaria (Linnaeus, 1758)
Cabera exanthemata (Scopoli, 1763)
Cabera pusaria (Linnaeus, 1758)
Campaea margaritaria (Linnaeus, 1761)
Camptogramma bilineata (Linnaeus, 1758)
Camptogramma scripturata (Hübner, 1799)
Carsia lythoxylata (Hübner, 1799)
Carsia sororiata (Hübner, 1813)
Cataclysme riguata (Hübner, 1813)
Catarhoe cuculata (Hufnagel, 1767)
Catarhoe putridaria (Herrich-Schäffer, 1852)
Catarhoe rubidata (Denis & Schiffermuller, 1775)
Charissa certhiatus (Rebel & Zerny, 1931)
Charissa obscurata (Denis & Schiffermuller, 1775)
Charissa pullata (Denis & Schiffermuller, 1775)
Charissa variegata (Duponchel, 1830)
Chiasmia clathrata (Linnaeus, 1758)
Chlorissa cloraria (Hübner, 1813)
Chlorissa viridata (Linnaeus, 1758)
Chloroclysta siterata (Hufnagel, 1767)
Chloroclystis v-ata (Haworth, 1809)
Cidaria fulvata (Forster, 1771)
Cleora cinctaria (Denis & Schiffermuller, 1775)
Coenotephria ablutaria (Boisduval, 1840)
Coenotephria tophaceata (Denis & Schiffermuller, 1775)
Colostygia aptata (Hübner, 1813)
Colostygia aqueata (Hübner, 1813)
Colostygia olivata (Denis & Schiffermuller, 1775)
Colostygia pectinataria (Knoch, 1781)
Colostygia sericeata (Schwingenschuss, 1926)
Colostygia turbata (Hübner, 1799)
Colotois pennaria (Linnaeus, 1761)
Comibaena bajularia (Denis & Schiffermuller, 1775)
Cosmorhoe ocellata (Linnaeus, 1758)
Crocallis elinguaria (Linnaeus, 1758)
Cyclophora linearia (Hübner, 1799)
Cyclophora porata (Linnaeus, 1767)
Cyclophora punctaria (Linnaeus, 1758)
Cyclophora puppillaria (Hübner, 1799)
Cyclophora albiocellaria (Hübner, 1789)
Cyclophora annularia (Fabricius, 1775)
Cyclophora quercimontaria (Bastelberger, 1897)
Cyclophora ruficiliaria (Herrich-Schäffer, 1855)
Dasycorsa modesta (Staudinger, 1879)
Dysstroma citrata (Linnaeus, 1761)
Dysstroma truncata (Hufnagel, 1767)
Earophila badiata (Denis & Schiffermuller, 1775)
Ecliptopera silaceata (Denis & Schiffermuller, 1775)
Ectropis crepuscularia (Denis & Schiffermuller, 1775)
Eilicrinia cordiaria (Hübner, 1790)
Eilicrinia trinotata (Metzner, 1845)
Elophos vittaria (Thunberg, 1788)
Ematurga atomaria (Linnaeus, 1758)
Ennomos alniaria (Linnaeus, 1758)
Ennomos autumnaria (Werneburg, 1859)
Ennomos fuscantaria (Haworth, 1809)
Ennomos quercinaria (Hufnagel, 1767)
Entephria caesiata (Denis & Schiffermuller, 1775)
Entephria cyanata (Hübner, 1809)
Entephria flavicinctata (Hübner, 1813)
Entephria infidaria (de La Harpe, 1853)
Entephria nobiliaria (Herrich-Schäffer, 1852)
Epione repandaria (Hufnagel, 1767)
Epirrhoe alternata (Muller, 1764)
Epirrhoe galiata (Denis & Schiffermuller, 1775)
Epirrhoe molluginata (Hübner, 1813)
Epirrhoe rivata (Hübner, 1813)
Epirrhoe tristata (Linnaeus, 1758)
Epirrita dilutata (Denis & Schiffermuller, 1775)
Erannis defoliaria (Clerck, 1759)
Euchoeca nebulata (Scopoli, 1763)
Eulithis populata (Linnaeus, 1758)
Eulithis prunata (Linnaeus, 1758)
Euphyia adumbraria (Herrich-Schäffer, 1852)
Euphyia frustata (Treitschke, 1828)
Euphyia mesembrina (Rebel, 1927)
Eupithecia abbreviata (Stephens, 1831)
Eupithecia abietaria (Goeze, 1781)
Eupithecia absinthiata (Clerck, 1759)
Eupithecia analoga (Djakonov, 1926)
Eupithecia breviculata (Donzel, 1837)
Eupithecia centaureata (Denis & Schiffermuller, 1775)
Eupithecia cretaceata (Packard, 1874)
Eupithecia denotata (Hübner, 1813)
Eupithecia denticulata (Treitschke, 1828)
Eupithecia distinctaria Herrich-Schäffer, 1848
Eupithecia dodoneata Guenée, 1858
Eupithecia druentiata Dietze, 1902
Eupithecia egenaria Herrich-Schäffer, 1848
Eupithecia extraversaria Herrich-Schäffer, 1852
Eupithecia extremata (Fabricius, 1787)
Eupithecia gemellata Herrich-Schäffer, 1861
Eupithecia graphata (Treitschke, 1828)
Eupithecia gratiosata Herrich-Schäffer, 1861
Eupithecia haworthiata Doubleday, 1856
Eupithecia icterata (de Villers, 1789)
Eupithecia impurata (Hübner, 1813)
Eupithecia indigata (Hübner, 1813)
Eupithecia innotata (Hufnagel, 1767)
Eupithecia insigniata (Hübner, 1790)
Eupithecia intricata (Zetterstedt, 1839)
Eupithecia lariciata (Freyer, 1841)
Eupithecia linariata (Denis & Schiffermüller, 1775)
Eupithecia millefoliata Rossler, 1866
Eupithecia ochridata Schutze & Pinker, 1968
Eupithecia oxycedrata (Rambur, 1833)
Eupithecia pimpinellata (Hübner, 1813)
Eupithecia plumbeolata (Haworth, 1809)
Eupithecia pusillata (Denis & Schiffermuller, 1775)
Eupithecia pyreneata Mabille, 1871
Eupithecia satyrata (Hübner, 1813)
Eupithecia schiefereri Bohatsch, 1893
Eupithecia semigraphata Bruand, 1850
Eupithecia silenicolata Mabille, 1867
Eupithecia spissilineata (Metzner, 1846)
Eupithecia subfuscata (Haworth, 1809)
Eupithecia subumbrata (Denis & Schiffermuller, 1775)
Eupithecia tantillaria Boisduval, 1840
Eupithecia tripunctaria Herrich-Schäffer, 1852
Eupithecia undata (Freyer, 1840)
Eupithecia venosata (Fabricius, 1787)
Eupithecia veratraria (Herrich-Schäffer, 1848)
Eupithecia vulgata (Haworth, 1809)
Eustroma reticulata (Denis & Schiffermuller, 1775)
Fagivorina arenaria (Hufnagel, 1767)
Gagitodes sagittata (Fabricius, 1787)
Gandaritis pyraliata (Denis & Schiffermuller, 1775)
Geometra papilionaria (Linnaeus, 1758)
Glacies canaliculata (Hochenwarth, 1785)
Gnophos furvata (Denis & Schiffermuller, 1775)
Gnophos obfuscata (Denis & Schiffermuller, 1775)
Gnophos dumetata Treitschke, 1827
Gnophos sartata Treitschke, 1827
Gymnoscelis rufifasciata (Haworth, 1809)
Heliomata glarearia (Denis & Schiffermuller, 1775)
Hemistola chrysoprasaria (Esper, 1795)
Hemithea aestivaria (Hübner, 1789)
Horisme aemulata (Hübner, 1813)
Horisme calligraphata (Herrich-Schäffer, 1838)
Horisme corticata (Treitschke, 1835)
Horisme radicaria (de La Harpe, 1855)
Horisme tersata (Denis & Schiffermuller, 1775)
Horisme vitalbata (Denis & Schiffermuller, 1775)
Hydrelia flammeolaria (Hufnagel, 1767)
Hydria cervinalis (Scopoli, 1763)
Hydriomena furcata (Thunberg, 1784)
Hydriomena ruberata (Freyer, 1831)
Hylaea fasciaria (Linnaeus, 1758)
Hypomecis punctinalis (Scopoli, 1763)
Hypomecis roboraria (Denis & Schiffermuller, 1775)
Idaea aureolaria (Denis & Schiffermuller, 1775)
Idaea aversata (Linnaeus, 1758)
Idaea biselata (Hufnagel, 1767)
Idaea camparia (Herrich-Schäffer, 1852)
Idaea consanguinaria (Lederer, 1853)
Idaea consolidata (Lederer, 1853)
Idaea degeneraria (Hübner, 1799)
Idaea determinata (Staudinger, 1876)
Idaea deversaria (Herrich-Schäffer, 1847)
Idaea dilutaria (Hübner, 1799)
Idaea dimidiata (Hufnagel, 1767)
Idaea filicata  (Hübner, 1798)
Idaea fuscovenosa (Goeze, 1781)
Idaea humiliata (Hufnagel, 1767)
Idaea inquinata (Scopoli, 1763)
Idaea moniliata (Denis & Schiffermuller, 1775)
Idaea muricata (Hufnagel, 1767)
Idaea nitidata (Herrich-Schäffer, 1861)
Idaea obsoletaria (Rambur, 1833)
Idaea ochrata (Scopoli, 1763)
Idaea ossiculata (Lederer, 1870)
Idaea ostrinaria (Hübner, 1813)
Idaea pallidata (Denis & Schiffermuller, 1775)
Idaea politaria (Hübner, 1799)
Idaea rufaria (Hübner, 1799)
Idaea rusticata (Denis & Schiffermuller, 1775)
Idaea seriata (Schrank, 1802)
Idaea serpentata (Hufnagel, 1767)
Idaea straminata (Borkhausen, 1794)
Idaea subsericeata (Haworth, 1809)
Idaea trigeminata (Haworth, 1809)
Isturgia arenacearia (Denis & Schiffermuller, 1775)
Isturgia roraria (Fabricius, 1776)
Jodis lactearia (Linnaeus, 1758)
Lampropteryx suffumata (Denis & Schiffermuller, 1775)
Ligdia adustata (Denis & Schiffermuller, 1775)
Lignyoptera thaumastaria Rebel, 1901
Lithostege farinata (Hufnagel, 1767)
Lithostege griseata (Denis & Schiffermuller, 1775)
Lomaspilis marginata (Linnaeus, 1758)
Lomaspilis opis Butler, 1878
Lycia hirtaria (Clerck, 1759)
Lythria cruentaria (Hufnagel, 1767)
Lythria purpuraria (Linnaeus, 1758)
Macaria alternata (Denis & Schiffermuller, 1775)
Macaria artesiaria (Denis & Schiffermuller, 1775)
Macaria brunneata (Thunberg, 1784)
Macaria notata (Linnaeus, 1758)
Melanthia procellata (Denis & Schiffermuller, 1775)
Menophra abruptaria (Thunberg, 1792)
Mesoleuca albicillata (Linnaeus, 1758)
Mesotype didymata (Linnaeus, 1758)
Mesotype verberata (Scopoli, 1763)
Microloxia herbaria Hübner, 1808
Minoa murinata (Scopoli, 1763)
Nebula achromaria (de La Harpe, 1853)
Nebula nebulata (Treitschke, 1828)
Nothocasis sertata (Hübner, 1817)
Nycterosea obstipata (Fabricius, 1794)
Odezia atrata (Linnaeus, 1758)
Operophtera brumata (Linnaeus, 1758)
Operophtera fagata (Scharfenberg, 1805)
Opisthograptis luteolata (Linnaeus, 1758)
Orthostixis cribraria (Hübner, 1799)
Ourapteryx sambucaria (Linnaeus, 1758)
Parectropis similaria (Hufnagel, 1767)
Pelurga comitata (Linnaeus, 1758)
Perconia strigillaria (Hübner, 1787)
Peribatodes correptaria (Zeller, 1847)
Peribatodes rhomboidaria (Denis & Schiffermuller, 1775)
Peribatodes secundaria (Denis & Schiffermuller, 1775)
Perizoma affinitata (Stephens, 1831)
Perizoma albulata (Denis & Schiffermuller, 1775)
Perizoma alchemillata (Linnaeus, 1758)
Perizoma blandiata (Denis & Schiffermuller, 1775)
Perizoma flavofasciata (Thunberg, 1792)
Perizoma hydrata (Treitschke, 1829)
Perizoma incultaria (Herrich-Schäffer, 1848)
Perizoma minorata (Treitschke, 1828)
Perizoma obsoletata (Herrich-Schäffer, 1838)
Phaiogramma etruscaria (Zeller, 1849)
Phigalia pilosaria (Denis & Schiffermuller, 1775)
Plagodis dolabraria (Linnaeus, 1767)
Plagodis pulveraria (Linnaeus, 1758)
Pseudobaptria bogumilaria (Rebel, 1904)
Pseudopanthera macularia (Linnaeus, 1758)
Pseudoterpna pruinata (Hufnagel, 1767)
Rhodometra sacraria (Linnaeus, 1767)
Rhodostrophia calabra (Petagna, 1786)
Rhodostrophia discopunctata Amsel, 1935
Rhodostrophia vibicaria (Clerck, 1759)
Schistostege decussata (Denis & Schiffermuller, 1775)
Scopula confinaria (Herrich-Schäffer, 1847)
Scopula imitaria (Hübner, 1799)
Scopula immutata (Linnaeus, 1758)
Scopula incanata (Linnaeus, 1758)
Scopula marginepunctata (Goeze, 1781)
Scopula submutata (Treitschke, 1828)
Scopula subpunctaria (Herrich-Schäffer, 1847)
Scopula ternata Schrank, 1802
Scopula decorata (Denis & Schiffermuller, 1775)
Scopula immorata (Linnaeus, 1758)
Scopula nigropunctata (Hufnagel, 1767)
Scopula ornata (Scopoli, 1763)
Scopula rubiginata (Hufnagel, 1767)
Scopula tessellaria (Boisduval, 1840)
Scopula umbelaria (Hübner, 1813)
Scotopteryx bipunctaria (Denis & Schiffermuller, 1775)
Scotopteryx chenopodiata (Linnaeus, 1758)
Scotopteryx moeniata (Scopoli, 1763)
Scotopteryx mucronata (Scopoli, 1763)
Scotopteryx vicinaria (Duponchel, 1830)
Selenia dentaria (Fabricius, 1775)
Selenia lunularia (Hübner, 1788)
Selidosema plumaria (Denis & Schiffermuller, 1775)
Siona lineata (Scopoli, 1763)
Stegania dilectaria (Hübner, 1790)
Synopsia sociaria (Hübner, 1799)
Thalera fimbrialis (Scopoli, 1763)
Thera juniperata (Linnaeus, 1758)
Thera vetustata (Denis & Schiffermuller, 1775)
Therapis flavicaria (Denis & Schiffermuller, 1775)
Thetidia smaragdaria (Fabricius, 1787)
Timandra comae Schmidt, 1931
Trichopteryx carpinata (Borkhausen, 1794)
Triphosa dubitata (Linnaeus, 1758)
Triphosa sabaudiata (Duponchel, 1830)
Xanthorhoe ferrugata (Clerck, 1759)
Xanthorhoe fluctuata (Linnaeus, 1758)
Xanthorhoe incursata (Hübner, 1813)
Xanthorhoe montanata (Denis & Schiffermuller, 1775)
Xanthorhoe oxybiata (Milliere, 1872)
Xanthorhoe quadrifasiata (Clerck, 1759)
Xanthorhoe spadicearia (Denis & Schiffermuller, 1775)

Glyphipterigidae
Acrolepia autumnitella Curtis, 1838
Acrolepiopsis assectella (Zeller, 1839)
Acrolepiopsis vesperella (Zeller, 1850)
Glyphipterix fuscoviridella (Haworth, 1828)

Gracillariidae
Aspilapteryx limosella (Duponchel, 1843)
Aspilapteryx tringipennella (Zeller, 1839)
Caloptilia alchimiella (Scopoli, 1763)
Caloptilia cuculipennella (Hübner, 1796)
Caloptilia rhodinella (Herrich-Schäffer, 1855)
Calybites phasianipennella (Hübner, 1813)
Cameraria ohridella (Deschka & Dimic, 1986)
Euspilapteryx auroguttella Stephens, 1835
Gracillaria syringella (Fabricius, 1794)
Parectopa ononidis (Zeller, 1839)
Parornix anglicella (Stainton, 1850)
Parornix fagivora (Frey, 1861)
Phyllonorycter acerifoliella (Zeller, 1839)
Phyllonorycter amseli (Povolny & Gregor, 1955)
Phyllonorycter cavella (Zeller, 1846)
Phyllonorycter cerasicolella (Herrich-Schäffer, 1855)
Phyllonorycter esperella (Goeze, 1783)
Phyllonorycter eugregori A. & Z. Lastuvka, 2006
Phyllonorycter froelichiella (Zeller, 1839)
Phyllonorycter hostis (Triberti, 2007)
Phyllonorycter klemannella (Fabricius, 1781)
Phyllonorycter lapadiella (Krone, 1909)
Phyllonorycter medicaginella (Gerasimov, 1930)
Phyllonorycter platani (Staudinger, 1870)
Phyllonorycter rajella (Linnaeus, 1758)
Phyllonorycter roboris (Zeller, 1839)
Phyllonorycter spinicolella (Zeller, 1846)
Phyllonorycter strigulatella (Lienig & Zeller, 1846)
Phyllonorycter sublautella (Stainton, 1869)
Phyllonorycter trojana Deschka, 1982

Hepialidae
Hepialus humuli (Linnaeus, 1758)
Pharmacis carna (Denis & Schiffermuller, 1775)
Triodia sylvina (Linnaeus, 1761)

Heterogynidae
Heterogynis penella (Hübner, 1819)

Lasiocampidae
Cosmotriche lobulina (Denis & Schiffermuller, 1775)
Dendrolimus pini (Linnaeus, 1758)
Eriogaster catax (Linnaeus, 1758)
Eriogaster lanestris (Linnaeus, 1758)
Eriogaster rimicola (Denis & Schiffermuller, 1775)
Gastropacha quercifolia (Linnaeus, 1758)
Gastropacha populifolia (Denis & Schiffermuller, 1775)
Lasiocampa quercus (Linnaeus, 1758)
Lasiocampa grandis (Rogenhofer, 1891)
Lasiocampa trifolii (Denis & Schiffermuller, 1775)
Macrothylacia rubi (Linnaeus, 1758)
Malacosoma castrensis (Linnaeus, 1758)
Malacosoma neustria (Linnaeus, 1758)
Odonestis pruni (Linnaeus, 1758)
Phyllodesma tremulifolia (Hübner, 1810)
Poecilocampa alpina (Frey & Wullschlegel, 1874)
Poecilocampa populi (Linnaeus, 1758)
Trichiura crataegi (Linnaeus, 1758)

Lecithoceridae
Lecithocera nigrana (Duponchel, 1836)

Limacodidae
Apoda limacodes (Hufnagel, 1766)
Heterogenea asella (Denis & Schiffermuller, 1775)

Lyonetiidae
Leucoptera aceris (Fuchs, 1903)
Leucoptera heringiella Toll, 1938
Leucoptera laburnella (Stainton, 1851)
Leucoptera malifoliella (O. Costa, 1836)
Lyonetia clerkella (Linnaeus, 1758)
Lyonetia prunifoliella (Hübner, 1796)

Lypusidae
Pseudatemelia flavifrontella (Denis & Schiffermuller, 1775)

Micropterigidae
Micropterix aglaella (Duponchel, 1838)
Micropterix allionella (Fabricius, 1794)
Micropterix aruncella (Scopoli, 1763)
Micropterix corcyrella Walsingham, 1919
Micropterix kardamylensis Rebel, 1903
Micropterix mansuetella Zeller, 1844
Micropterix myrtetella Zeller, 1850
Micropterix rothenbachii Frey, 1856
Micropterix schaefferi Heath, 1975

Momphidae
Mompha miscella (Denis & Schiffermuller, 1775)
Mompha epilobiella (Denis & Schiffermuller, 1775)

Nepticulidae
Ectoedemia angulifasciella (Stainton, 1849)
Ectoedemia arcuatella (Herrich-Schäffer, 1855)
Ectoedemia argyropeza (Zeller, 1839)
Ectoedemia atricollis (Stainton, 1857)
Ectoedemia hannoverella (Glitz, 1872)
Ectoedemia heringi (Toll, 1934)
Ectoedemia intimella (Zeller, 1848)
Ectoedemia klimeschi (Skala, 1933)
Ectoedemia liechtensteini (Zimmermann, 1944)
Ectoedemia rubivora (Wocke, 1860)
Ectoedemia subbimaculella (Haworth, 1828)
Ectoedemia turbidella (Zeller, 1848)
Ectoedemia septembrella (Stainton, 1849)
Enteucha acetosae (Stainton, 1854)
Simplimorpha promissa (Staudinger, 1871)
Stigmella aceris (Frey, 1857)
Stigmella alnetella (Stainton, 1856)
Stigmella anomalella (Goeze, 1783)
Stigmella assimilella (Zeller, 1848)
Stigmella aurella (Fabricius, 1775)
Stigmella basiguttella (Heinemann, 1862)
Stigmella betulicola (Stainton, 1856)
Stigmella centifoliella (Zeller, 1848)
Stigmella freyella (Heyden, 1858)
Stigmella glutinosae (Stainton, 1858)
Stigmella hybnerella (Hübner, 1796)
Stigmella incognitella (Herrich-Schäffer, 1855)
Stigmella lapponica (Wocke, 1862)
Stigmella lemniscella (Zeller, 1839)
Stigmella luteella (Stainton, 1857)
Stigmella malella (Stainton, 1854)
Stigmella mespilicola (Frey, 1856)
Stigmella microtheriella (Stainton, 1854)
Stigmella minusculella (Herrich-Schäffer, 1855)
Stigmella nivenburgensis (Preissecker, 1942)
Stigmella obliquella (Heinemann, 1862)
Stigmella oxyacanthella (Stainton, 1854)
Stigmella perpygmaeella (Doubleday, 1859)
Stigmella plagicolella (Stainton, 1854)
Stigmella prunetorum (Stainton, 1855)
Stigmella pyri (Glitz, 1865)
Stigmella rhamnella (Herrich-Schäffer, 1860)
Stigmella sakhalinella Puplesis, 1984
Stigmella salicis (Stainton, 1854)
Stigmella samiatella (Zeller, 1839)
Stigmella speciosa (Frey, 1858)
Stigmella splendidissimella (Herrich-Schäffer, 1855)
Stigmella tiliae (Frey, 1856)
Stigmella trimaculella (Haworth, 1828)
Stigmella ulmivora (Fologne, 1860)
Stigmella zangherii (Klimesch, 1951)
Trifurcula cryptella (Stainton, 1856)

Noctuidae
Abrostola agnorista Dufay, 1956
Abrostola asclepiadis (Denis & Schiffermuller, 1775)
Abrostola tripartita (Hufnagel, 1766)
Abrostola triplasia (Linnaeus, 1758)
Acontia lucida (Hufnagel, 1766)
Acontia trabealis (Scopoli, 1763)
Acontia melanura (Tauscher, 1809)
Acontiola moldavicola (Herrich-Schäffer, 1851)
Acosmetia caliginosa (Hübner, 1813)
Acronicta aceris (Linnaeus, 1758)
Acronicta leporina (Linnaeus, 1758)
Acronicta strigosa (Denis & Schiffermuller, 1775)
Acronicta alni (Linnaeus, 1767)
Acronicta cuspis (Hübner, 1813)
Acronicta psi (Linnaeus, 1758)
Acronicta tridens (Denis & Schiffermuller, 1775)
Acronicta auricoma (Denis & Schiffermuller, 1775)
Acronicta euphorbiae (Denis & Schiffermuller, 1775)
Acronicta orientalis (Mann, 1862)
Acronicta rumicis (Linnaeus, 1758)
Actebia praecox (Linnaeus, 1758)
Actebia fugax (Treitschke, 1825)
Actinotia polyodon (Clerck, 1759)
Actinotia radiosa (Esper, 1804)
Aedia funesta (Esper, 1786)
Aedia leucomelas (Linnaeus, 1758)
Aegle kaekeritziana (Hübner, 1799)
Aegle semicana (Esper, 1798)
Agrochola circellaris (Hufnagel, 1766)
Agrochola lychnidis (Denis & Schiffermuller, 1775)
Agrochola lactiflora (Draudt, 1934)
Agrochola helvola (Linnaeus, 1758)
Agrochola humilis (Denis & Schiffermuller, 1775)
Agrochola kindermannii (Fischer v. Röslerstamm, 1837)
Agrochola litura (Linnaeus, 1758)
Agrochola nitida (Denis & Schiffermuller, 1775)
Agrochola thurneri Boursin, 1953
Agrochola lota (Clerck, 1759)
Agrochola macilenta (Hübner, 1809)
Agrochola laevis (Hübner, 1803)
Agrotis bigramma (Esper, 1790)
Agrotis cinerea (Denis & Schiffermuller, 1775)
Agrotis clavis (Hufnagel, 1766)
Agrotis exclamationis (Linnaeus, 1758)
Agrotis ipsilon (Hufnagel, 1766)
Agrotis puta (Hübner, 1803)
Agrotis segetum (Denis & Schiffermuller, 1775)
Agrotis spinifera (Hübner, 1808)
Allophyes oxyacanthae (Linnaeus, 1758)
Amephana dalmatica (Rebel, 1919)
Ammoconia caecimacula (Denis & Schiffermuller, 1775)
Ammoconia senex (Geyer, 1828)
Amphipoea fucosa (Freyer, 1830)
Amphipoea oculea (Linnaeus, 1761)
Amphipyra berbera Rungs, 1949
Amphipyra effusa Boisduval, 1828
Amphipyra livida (Denis & Schiffermuller, 1775)
Amphipyra micans Lederer, 1857
Amphipyra perflua (Fabricius, 1787)
Amphipyra pyramidea (Linnaeus, 1758)
Amphipyra stix Herrich-Schäffer, 1850
Amphipyra tetra (Fabricius, 1787)
Amphipyra tragopoginis (Clerck, 1759)
Amphipyra cinnamomea (Goeze, 1781)
Anaplectoides prasina (Denis & Schiffermuller, 1775)
Anarta myrtilli (Linnaeus, 1761)
Anarta dianthi (Tauscher, 1809)
Anarta odontites (Boisduval, 1829)
Anarta trifolii (Hufnagel, 1766)
Anorthoa munda (Denis & Schiffermuller, 1775)
Anthracia eriopoda (Herrich-Schäffer, 1851)
Antitype chi (Linnaeus, 1758)
Antitype jonis (Lederer, 1865)
Antitype suda (Geyer, 1832)
Apamea anceps (Denis & Schiffermuller, 1775)
Apamea aquila (Donzel, 1837)
Apamea crenata (Hufnagel, 1766)
Apamea epomidion (Haworth, 1809)
Apamea furva (Denis & Schiffermuller, 1775)
Apamea illyria Freyer, 1846
Apamea lateritia (Hufnagel, 1766)
Apamea lithoxylaea (Denis & Schiffermuller, 1775)
Apamea maillardi (Geyer, 1834)
Apamea michielii Varga, 1976
Apamea monoglypha (Hufnagel, 1766)
Apamea oblonga (Haworth, 1809)
Apamea platinea (Treitschke, 1825)
Apamea remissa (Hübner, 1809)
Apamea rubrirena (Treitschke, 1825)
Apamea scolopacina (Esper, 1788)
Apamea sordens (Hufnagel, 1766)
Apamea sublustris (Esper, 1788)
Apamea unanimis (Hübner, 1813)
Apamea zeta (Treitschke, 1825)
Apaustis rupicola (Denis & Schiffermuller, 1775)
Aporophyla australis (Boisduval, 1829)
Aporophyla canescens (Duponchel, 1826)
Aporophyla lutulenta (Denis & Schiffermuller, 1775)
Aporophyla nigra (Haworth, 1809)
Apterogenum ypsillon (Denis & Schiffermuller, 1775)
Archanara neurica (Hübner, 1808)
Asteroscopus sphinx (Hufnagel, 1766)
Asteroscopus syriaca (Warren, 1910)
Atethmia ambusta (Denis & Schiffermuller, 1775)
Atethmia centrago (Haworth, 1809)
Athetis furvula (Hübner, 1808)
Athetis gluteosa (Treitschke, 1835)
Athetis pallustris (Hübner, 1808)
Athetis lepigone (Moschler, 1860)
Atypha pulmonaris (Esper, 1790)
Auchmis detersa (Esper, 1787)
Autographa gamma (Linnaeus, 1758)
Autographa jota (Linnaeus, 1758)
Autographa pulchrina (Haworth, 1809)
Axylia putris (Linnaeus, 1761)
Behounekia freyeri (Frivaldszky, 1835)
Brachionycha nubeculosa (Esper, 1785)
Brachylomia viminalis (Fabricius, 1776)
Brithys crini (Fabricius, 1775)
Bryophila ereptricula Treitschke, 1825
Bryophila orthogramma (Boursin, 1954)
Bryophila raptricula (Denis & Schiffermuller, 1775)
Bryophila ravula (Hübner, 1813)
Bryophila rectilinea (Warren, 1909)
Bryophila seladona (Christoph, 1885)
Bryophila tephrocharis (Boursin, 1953)
Bryophila domestica (Hufnagel, 1766)
Calamia tridens (Hufnagel, 1766)
Calliergis ramosa (Esper, 1786)
Callopistria juventina (Stoll, 1782)
Callopistria latreillei (Duponchel, 1827)
Calophasia lunula (Hufnagel, 1766)
Calophasia opalina (Esper, 1793)
Calophasia platyptera (Esper, 1788)
Caradrina morpheus (Hufnagel, 1766)
Caradrina gilva (Donzel, 1837)
Caradrina clavipalpis (Scopoli, 1763)
Caradrina flavirena Guenee, 1852
Caradrina selini Boisduval, 1840
Caradrina suscianja (Mentzer, 1981)
Caradrina wullschlegeli Pungeler, 1903
Caradrina aspersa Rambur, 1834
Caradrina kadenii (Freyer, 1836)
Caradrina terrea (Freyer, 1840)
Ceramica pisi (Linnaeus, 1758)
Cerapteryx graminis (Linnaeus, 1758)
Cerastis leucographa (Denis & Schiffermuller, 1775)
Cerastis rubricosa (Denis & Schiffermuller, 1775)
Charanyca trigrammica (Hufnagel, 1766)
Charanyca apfelbecki (Rebel, 1901)
Charanyca ferruginea (Esper, 1785)
Chersotis cuprea (Denis & Schiffermuller, 1775)
Chersotis margaritacea (Villers, 1789)
Chersotis multangula (Hübner, 1803)
Chilodes maritima (Tauscher, 1806)
Chloantha hyperici (Denis & Schiffermuller, 1775)
Chrysodeixis chalcites (Esper, 1789)
Cleoceris scoriacea (Esper, 1789)
Cleonymia opposita (Lederer, 1870)
Colocasia coryli (Linnaeus, 1758)
Condica viscosa (Freyer, 1831)
Conisania luteago (Denis & Schiffermuller, 1775)
Conistra ligula (Esper, 1791)
Conistra rubiginosa (Scopoli, 1763)
Conistra vaccinii (Linnaeus, 1761)
Conistra veronicae (Hübner, 1813)
Conistra erythrocephala (Denis & Schiffermuller, 1775)
Conistra rubiginea (Denis & Schiffermuller, 1775)
Conistra ragusae (Failla-Tedaldi, 1890)
Conistra torrida (Lederer, 1857)
Cosmia trapezina (Linnaeus, 1758)
Cosmia pyralina (Denis & Schiffermuller, 1775)
Cosmia confinis Herrich-Schäffer, 1849
Cosmia affinis (Linnaeus, 1767)
Craniophora ligustri (Denis & Schiffermuller, 1775)
Craniophora pontica (Staudinger, 1878)
Cryphia fraudatricula (Hübner, 1803)
Cryphia receptricula (Hübner, 1803)
Cryphia algae (Fabricius, 1775)
Cryphia ochsi (Boursin, 1940)
Crypsedra gemmea (Treitschke, 1825)
Ctenoplusia accentifera (Lefebvre, 1827)
Cucullia celsiae (Herrich-Schäffer, 1850)
Cucullia absinthii (Linnaeus, 1761)
Cucullia argentea (Hufnagel, 1766)
Cucullia artemisiae (Hufnagel, 1766)
Cucullia asteris (Denis & Schiffermuller, 1775)
Cucullia balsamitae Boisduval, 1840
Cucullia campanulae Freyer, 1831
Cucullia chamomillae (Denis & Schiffermuller, 1775)
Cucullia formosa Rogenhofer, 1860
Cucullia fraudatrix Eversmann, 1837
Cucullia lactucae (Denis & Schiffermuller, 1775)
Cucullia lucifuga (Denis & Schiffermuller, 1775)
Cucullia santonici (Hübner, 1813)
Cucullia scopariae (Dorfmeister, 1853)
Cucullia tanaceti (Denis & Schiffermuller, 1775)
Cucullia umbratica (Linnaeus, 1758)
Cucullia xeranthemi Boisduval, 1840
Cucullia blattariae (Esper, 1790)
Cucullia gozmanyi (G. Ronkay & L. Ronkay, 1994)
Cucullia lanceolata (Villers, 1789)
Cucullia lychnitis (Rambur, 1833)
Cucullia prenanthis (Boisduval, 1840)
Cucullia scrophulariae (Denis & Schiffermuller, 1775)
Cucullia verbasci (Linnaeus, 1758)
Dasypolia ferdinandi Ruhl, 1892
Deltote bankiana (Fabricius, 1775)
Deltote deceptoria (Scopoli, 1763)
Deltote uncula (Clerck, 1759)
Deltote pygarga (Hufnagel, 1766)
Denticucullus pygmina (Haworth, 1809)
Diachrysia chrysitis (Linnaeus, 1758)
Diachrysia chryson (Esper, 1789)
Diachrysia nadeja (Oberthur, 1880)
Diachrysia zosimi (Hübner, 1822)
Diarsia mendica (Fabricius, 1775)
Diarsia rubi (Vieweg, 1790)
Dichagyris flammatra (Denis & Schiffermuller, 1775)
Dichagyris musiva (Hübner, 1803)
Dichagyris forcipula (Denis & Schiffermuller, 1775)
Dichagyris renigera (Hübner, 1808)
Dichonia aeruginea (Hübner, 1808)
Dichonia convergens (Denis & Schiffermuller, 1775)
Dicycla oo (Linnaeus, 1758)
Diloba caeruleocephala (Linnaeus, 1758)
Dioszeghyana schmidti (Dioszeghy, 1935)
Divaena haywardi (Tams, 1926)
Dryobota labecula (Esper, 1788)
Dryobotodes tenebrosa (Esper, 1789)
Dryobotodes carbonis Wagner, 1931
Dryobotodes eremita (Fabricius, 1775)
Dryobotodes monochroma (Esper, 1790)
Dypterygia scabriuscula (Linnaeus, 1758)
Egira conspicillaris (Linnaeus, 1758)
Elaphria venustula (Hübner, 1790)
Enargia abluta (Hübner, 1808)
Enterpia laudeti (Boisduval, 1840)
Epilecta linogrisea (Denis & Schiffermuller, 1775)
Epimecia ustula (Freyer, 1835)
Episema glaucina (Esper, 1789)
Episema korsakovi (Christoph, 1885)
Episema lederi Christoph, 1885
Episema tersa (Denis & Schiffermuller, 1775)
Eremobia ochroleuca (Denis & Schiffermuller, 1775)
Eucarta amethystina (Hübner, 1803)
Eucarta virgo (Treitschke, 1835)
Euchalcia consona (Fabricius, 1787)
Euchalcia modestoides Poole, 1989
Eugnorisma depuncta (Linnaeus, 1761)
Eugraphe sigma (Denis & Schiffermuller, 1775)
Euplexia lucipara (Linnaeus, 1758)
Eupsilia transversa (Hufnagel, 1766)
Euxoa aquilina (Denis & Schiffermuller, 1775)
Euxoa cos (Hübner, 1824)
Euxoa decora (Denis & Schiffermuller, 1775)
Euxoa distinguenda (Lederer, 1857)
Euxoa glabella Wagner, 1930
Euxoa hastifera (Donzel, 1847)
Euxoa nigricans (Linnaeus, 1761)
Euxoa nigrofusca (Esper, 1788)
Euxoa obelisca (Denis & Schiffermuller, 1775)
Euxoa temera (Hübner, 1808)
Euxoa tritici (Linnaeus, 1761)
Evisa schawerdae Reisser, 1930
Globia algae (Esper, 1789)
Gortyna borelii (Pierret, 1837)
Gortyna flavago (Denis & Schiffermuller, 1775)
Gortyna puengeleri (Turati, 1909)
Graphiphora augur (Fabricius, 1775)
Griposia aprilina (Linnaeus, 1758)
Hada plebeja (Linnaeus, 1761)
Hadena irregularis (Hufnagel, 1766)
Hadena perplexa (Denis & Schiffermuller, 1775)
Hadena silenes (Hübner, 1822)
Hadena adriana (Schawerda, 1921)
Hadena albimacula (Borkhausen, 1792)
Hadena caesia (Denis & Schiffermuller, 1775)
Hadena capsincola (Denis & Schiffermuller, 1775)
Hadena clara (Staudinger, 1901)
Hadena compta (Denis & Schiffermuller, 1775)
Hadena confusa (Hufnagel, 1766)
Hadena drenowskii (Rebel, 1930)
Hadena filograna (Esper, 1788)
Hadena gueneei (Staudinger, 1901)
Hadena luteocincta (Rambur, 1834)
Hadena magnolii (Boisduval, 1829)
Hadena vulcanica (Turati, 1907)
Haemerosia renalis (Hübner, 1813)
Hecatera bicolorata (Hufnagel, 1766)
Hecatera cappa (Hübner, 1809)
Hecatera dysodea (Denis & Schiffermuller, 1775)
Helicoverpa armigera (Hübner, 1808)
Heliothis adaucta Butler, 1878
Heliothis incarnata (Freyer, 1838)
Heliothis maritima Graslin, 1855
Heliothis nubigera Herrich-Schäffer, 1851
Heliothis ononis (Denis & Schiffermuller, 1775)
Heliothis peltigera (Denis & Schiffermuller, 1775)
Heliothis viriplaca (Hufnagel, 1766)
Helivictoria victorina (Sodoffsky, 1849)
Hoplodrina ambigua (Denis & Schiffermuller, 1775)
Hoplodrina blanda (Denis & Schiffermuller, 1775)
Hoplodrina octogenaria (Goeze, 1781)
Hoplodrina respersa (Denis & Schiffermuller, 1775)
Hoplodrina superstes (Ochsenheimer, 1816)
Hydraecia micacea (Esper, 1789)
Hydraecia petasitis Doubleday, 1847
Hyppa rectilinea (Esper, 1788)
Ipimorpha retusa (Linnaeus, 1761)
Ipimorpha subtusa (Denis & Schiffermuller, 1775)
Janthinea friwaldskii (Duponchel, 1835)
Jodia croceago (Denis & Schiffermuller, 1775)
Lacanobia contigua (Denis & Schiffermuller, 1775)
Lacanobia suasa (Denis & Schiffermuller, 1775)
Lacanobia thalassina (Hufnagel, 1766)
Lacanobia aliena (Hübner, 1809)
Lacanobia blenna (Hübner, 1824)
Lacanobia oleracea (Linnaeus, 1758)
Lacanobia splendens (Hübner, 1808)
Lacanobia w-latinum (Hufnagel, 1766)
Lamprotes c-aureum (Knoch, 1781)
Lasionycta proxima (Hübner, 1809)
Lateroligia ophiogramma (Esper, 1794)
Lenisa geminipuncta (Haworth, 1809)
Leucania loreyi (Duponchel, 1827)
Leucania comma (Linnaeus, 1761)
Leucania obsoleta (Hübner, 1803)
Leucania punctosa (Treitschke, 1825)
Leucania putrescens (Hübner, 1824)
Leucania zeae (Duponchel, 1827)
Lithophane furcifera (Hufnagel, 1766)
Lithophane ledereri (Staudinger, 1892)
Lithophane merckii (Rambur, 1832)
Lithophane ornitopus (Hufnagel, 1766)
Lithophane semibrunnea (Haworth, 1809)
Lithophane socia (Hufnagel, 1766)
Lithophane lapidea (Hübner, 1808)
Litoligia literosa (Haworth, 1809)
Luperina dumerilii (Duponchel, 1826)
Luperina nickerlii (Freyer, 1845)
Luperina rubella (Duponchel, 1835)
Luperina testacea (Denis & Schiffermuller, 1775)
Macdunnoughia confusa (Stephens, 1850)
Mamestra brassicae (Linnaeus, 1758)
Maraschia grisescens Osthelder, 1933
Meganephria bimaculosa (Linnaeus, 1767)
Mesapamea secalella Remm, 1983
Mesapamea secalis (Linnaeus, 1758)
Mesogona acetosellae (Denis & Schiffermuller, 1775)
Mesoligia furuncula (Denis & Schiffermuller, 1775)
Mesotrosta signalis (Treitschke, 1829)
Mniotype adusta (Esper, 1790)
Mniotype satura (Denis & Schiffermuller, 1775)
Mniotype solieri (Boisduval, 1829)
Moma alpium (Osbeck, 1778)
Mormo maura (Linnaeus, 1758)
Mythimna riparia (Rambur, 1829)
Mythimna albipuncta (Denis & Schiffermuller, 1775)
Mythimna congrua (Hübner, 1817)
Mythimna ferrago (Fabricius, 1787)
Mythimna l-album (Linnaeus, 1767)
Mythimna languida (Walker, 1858)
Mythimna conigera (Denis & Schiffermuller, 1775)
Mythimna impura (Hübner, 1808)
Mythimna pallens (Linnaeus, 1758)
Mythimna pudorina (Denis & Schiffermuller, 1775)
Mythimna straminea (Treitschke, 1825)
Mythimna turca (Linnaeus, 1761)
Mythimna vitellina (Hübner, 1808)
Mythimna alopecuri (Boisduval, 1840)
Mythimna sicula (Treitschke, 1835)
Mythimna unipuncta (Haworth, 1809)
Naenia typica (Linnaeus, 1758)
Noctua comes Hübner, 1813
Noctua fimbriata (Schreber, 1759)
Noctua interjecta Hübner, 1803
Noctua interposita (Hübner, 1790)
Noctua janthina Denis & Schiffermuller, 1775
Noctua orbona (Hufnagel, 1766)
Noctua pronuba (Linnaeus, 1758)
Noctua tirrenica Biebinger, Speidel & Hanigk, 1983
Nyctobrya amasina (Draudt, 1931)
Nyctobrya muralis (Forster, 1771)
Ochropleura leucogaster (Freyer, 1831)
Ochropleura plecta (Linnaeus, 1761)
Oligia fasciuncula (Haworth, 1809)
Oligia latruncula (Denis & Schiffermuller, 1775)
Oligia strigilis (Linnaeus, 1758)
Oligia versicolor (Borkhausen, 1792)
Olivenebula subsericata (Herrich-Schäffer, 1861)
Omia cymbalariae (Hübner, 1809)
Omphalophana anatolica (Lederer, 1857)
Omphalophana antirrhinii (Hübner, 1803)
Opigena polygona (Denis & Schiffermuller, 1775)
Oria musculosa (Hübner, 1808)
Orthosia gracilis (Denis & Schiffermuller, 1775)
Orthosia opima (Hübner, 1809)
Orthosia cerasi (Fabricius, 1775)
Orthosia cruda (Denis & Schiffermuller, 1775)
Orthosia dalmatica (Wagner, 1909)
Orthosia miniosa (Denis & Schiffermuller, 1775)
Orthosia populeti (Fabricius, 1775)
Orthosia incerta (Hufnagel, 1766)
Orthosia gothica (Linnaeus, 1758)
Oxicesta chamoenices (Herrich-Schäffer, 1845)
Oxicesta geographica (Fabricius, 1787)
Oxytripia orbiculosa (Esper, 1799)
Pachetra sagittigera (Hufnagel, 1766)
Panchrysia aurea (Hübner, 1803)
Panchrysia v-argenteum (Esper, 1798)
Panemeria tenebrata (Scopoli, 1763)
Panolis flammea (Denis & Schiffermuller, 1775)
Papestra biren (Goeze, 1781)
Parastichtis suspecta (Hübner, 1817)
Peridroma saucia (Hübner, 1808)
Perigrapha i-cinctum (Denis & Schiffermuller, 1775)
Perigrapha rorida (Frivaldszky, 1835)
Periphanes delphinii (Linnaeus, 1758)
Philareta treitschkei (Frivaldszky, 1835)
Phlogophora meticulosa (Linnaeus, 1758)
Phlogophora scita (Hübner, 1790)
Photedes captiuncula (Treitschke, 1825)
Photedes extrema (Hübner, 1809)
Photedes minima (Haworth, 1809)
Photedes morrisii (Dale, 1837)
Phyllophila obliterata (Rambur, 1833)
Plusidia cheiranthi (Tauscher, 1809)
Polia bombycina (Hufnagel, 1766)
Polia nebulosa (Hufnagel, 1766)
Polychrysia moneta (Fabricius, 1787)
Polymixis culoti (Schawerda, 1921)
Polymixis leuconota (Frivaldszky, 1841)
Polymixis flavicincta (Denis & Schiffermuller, 1775)
Polymixis polymita (Linnaeus, 1761)
Polymixis rufocincta (Geyer, 1828)
Polymixis serpentina (Treitschke, 1825)
Polyphaenis sericata (Esper, 1787)
Praestilbia armeniaca Staudinger, 1892
Protoschinia scutosa (Denis & Schiffermuller, 1775)
Pseudeustrotia candidula (Denis & Schiffermuller, 1775)
Pseudluperina pozzii (Curo, 1883)
Pyrrhia purpura (Hübner, 1817)
Pyrrhia umbra (Hufnagel, 1766)
Rhizedra lutosa (Hübner, 1803)
Rhyacia lucipeta (Denis & Schiffermuller, 1775)
Rhyacia simulans (Hufnagel, 1766)
Rileyiana fovea (Treitschke, 1825)
Schinia cardui (Hübner, 1790)
Schinia cognata (Freyer, 1833)
Scotochrosta pulla (Denis & Schiffermuller, 1775)
Sesamia cretica (Lederer, 1857)
Sesamia nonagrioides (Lefebvre, 1827)
Sideridis rivularis (Fabricius, 1775)
Sideridis implexa (Hübner, 1809)
Sideridis kitti (Schawerda, 1914)
Sideridis reticulata (Goeze, 1781)
Sideridis lampra (Schawerda, 1913)
Sideridis turbida (Esper, 1790)
Simyra albovenosa (Goeze, 1781)
Simyra dentinosa Freyer, 1838
Simyra nervosa (Denis & Schiffermuller, 1775)
Spaelotis ravida (Denis & Schiffermuller, 1775)
Spaelotis senna (Freyer, 1829)
Spodoptera exigua (Hübner, 1808)
Standfussiana lucernea (Linnaeus, 1758)
Stenoecia dos (Freyer, 1838)
Subacronicta megacephala (Denis & Schiffermuller, 1775)
Syngrapha devergens (Hübner, 1813)
Synthymia fixa (Fabricius, 1787)
Teinoptera lunaki (Boursin, 1940)
Teinoptera olivina (Herrich-Schäffer, 1852)
Thalpophila matura (Hufnagel, 1766)
Tholera cespitis (Denis & Schiffermuller, 1775)
Tholera decimalis (Poda, 1761)
Thysanoplusia circumscripta (Freyer, 1831)
Thysanoplusia orichalcea (Fabricius, 1775)
Tiliacea aurago (Denis & Schiffermuller, 1775)
Tiliacea citrago (Linnaeus, 1758)
Tiliacea cypreago (Hampson, 1906)
Tiliacea sulphurago (Denis & Schiffermuller, 1775)
Trachea atriplicis (Linnaeus, 1758)
Trichoplusia ni (Hübner, 1803)
Trigonophora flammea (Esper, 1785)
Tyta luctuosa (Denis & Schiffermuller, 1775)
Ulochlaena hirta (Hübner, 1813)
Valeria jaspidea (Villers, 1789)
Valeria oleagina (Denis & Schiffermuller, 1775)
Xanthia gilvago (Denis & Schiffermuller, 1775)
Xanthia icteritia (Hufnagel, 1766)
Xanthia ocellaris (Borkhausen, 1792)
Xanthia ruticilla (Esper, 1791)
Xanthia togata (Esper, 1788)
Xestia ashworthii (Doubleday, 1855)
Xestia c-nigrum (Linnaeus, 1758)
Xestia ditrapezium (Denis & Schiffermuller, 1775)
Xestia speciosa (Hübner, 1813)
Xestia baja (Denis & Schiffermuller, 1775)
Xestia stigmatica (Hübner, 1813)
Xestia xanthographa (Denis & Schiffermuller, 1775)
Xylena exsoleta (Linnaeus, 1758)
Xylena lunifera Warren, 1910
Xylena vetusta (Hübner, 1813)

Nolidae
Bena bicolorana (Fuessly, 1775)
Earias clorana (Linnaeus, 1761)
Earias vernana (Fabricius, 1787)
Meganola albula (Denis & Schiffermuller, 1775)
Meganola strigula (Denis & Schiffermuller, 1775)
Meganola togatulalis (Hübner, 1796)
Nola confusalis (Herrich-Schäffer, 1847)
Nola cucullatella (Linnaeus, 1758)
Nola subchlamydula Staudinger, 1871
Nycteola asiatica (Krulikovsky, 1904)
Nycteola columbana (Turner, 1925)
Nycteola revayana (Scopoli, 1772)
Nycteola siculana (Fuchs, 1899)
Nycteola svecicus (Bryk, 1941)
Pseudoips prasinana (Linnaeus, 1758)

Notodontidae
Cerura erminea (Esper, 1783)
Cerura vinula (Linnaeus, 1758)
Clostera anachoreta (Denis & Schiffermuller, 1775)
Clostera anastomosis (Linnaeus, 1758)
Clostera curtula (Linnaeus, 1758)
Clostera pigra (Hufnagel, 1766)
Dicranura ulmi (Denis & Schiffermuller, 1775)
Drymonia dodonaea (Denis & Schiffermuller, 1775)
Drymonia obliterata (Esper, 1785)
Drymonia querna (Denis & Schiffermuller, 1775)
Drymonia ruficornis (Hufnagel, 1766)
Drymonia velitaris (Hufnagel, 1766)
Furcula bicuspis (Borkhausen, 1790)
Furcula bifida (Brahm, 1787)
Furcula furcula (Clerck, 1759)
Gluphisia crenata (Esper, 1785)
Harpyia milhauseri (Fabricius, 1775)
Notodonta dromedarius (Linnaeus, 1767)
Notodonta tritophus (Denis & Schiffermuller, 1775)
Notodonta ziczac (Linnaeus, 1758)
Paradrymonia vittata (Staudinger, 1892)
Peridea anceps (Goeze, 1781)
Peridea korbi (Rebel, 1918)
Phalera bucephala (Linnaeus, 1758)
Phalera bucephaloides (Ochsenheimer, 1810)
Pheosia gnoma (Fabricius, 1776)
Pheosia tremula (Clerck, 1759)
Pterostoma palpina (Clerck, 1759)
Ptilodon capucina (Linnaeus, 1758)
Ptilodon cucullina (Denis & Schiffermuller, 1775)
Ptilophora plumigera (Denis & Schiffermuller, 1775)
Spatalia argentina (Denis & Schiffermuller, 1775)
Stauropus fagi (Linnaeus, 1758)
Thaumetopoea processionea (Linnaeus, 1758)
Thaumetopoea solitaria (Freyer, 1838)

Oecophoridae
Batia lunaris (Haworth, 1828)
Crassa unitella (Hübner, 1796)
Endrosis sarcitrella (Linnaeus, 1758)
Epicallima icterinella (Mann, 1867)
Esperia sulphurella (Fabricius, 1775)
Harpella forficella (Scopoli, 1763)
Holoscolia huebneri Kocak, 1980
Minetia crinitus (Fabricius, 1798)
Oecophora bractella (Linnaeus, 1758)
Oecophora superior (Rebel, 1918)
Pleurota aristella (Linnaeus, 1767)
Pleurota bicostella (Clerck, 1759)
Pleurota pyropella (Denis & Schiffermuller, 1775)
Schiffermuelleria schaefferella (Linnaeus, 1758)

Opostegidae
Pseudopostega crepusculella (Zeller, 1839)

Peleopodidae
Carcina quercana (Fabricius, 1775)

Plutellidae
Eidophasia messingiella (Fischer von Röslerstamm, 1840)
Plutella xylostella (Linnaeus, 1758)
Rhigognostis senilella (Zetterstedt, 1839)

Prodoxidae
Lampronia rupella (Denis & Schiffermuller, 1775)

Psychidae
Anaproutia reticulatella (Bruand, 1853)
Bijugis bombycella (Denis & Schiffermuller, 1775)
Dahlica triquetrella (Hübner, 1813)
Eochorica balcanica (Rebel, 1919)
Luffia lapidella (Goeze, 1783)
Penestoglossa dardoinella (Milliere, 1863)
Rebelia sapho (Milliere, 1864)
Typhonia ciliaris (Ochsenheimer, 1810)

Pterophoridae
Agdistis bennetii (Curtis, 1833)
Amblyptilia acanthadactyla (Hübner, 1813)
Amblyptilia punctidactyla (Haworth, 1811)
Calyciphora nephelodactyla (Eversmann, 1844)
Capperia celeusi (Frey, 1886)
Capperia maratonica (Adamczewski, 1951)
Cnaemidophorus rhododactyla (Denis & Schiffermuller, 1775)
Crombrugghia distans (Zeller, 1847)
Crombrugghia laetus (Zeller, 1847)
Crombrugghia tristis (Zeller, 1841)
Emmelina monodactyla (Linnaeus, 1758)
Hellinsia inulae (Zeller, 1852)
Hellinsia lienigianus (Zeller, 1852)
Hellinsia osteodactylus (Zeller, 1841)
Hellinsia tephradactyla (Hübner, 1813)
Merrifieldia baliodactylus (Zeller, 1841)
Merrifieldia leucodactyla (Denis & Schiffermuller, 1775)
Merrifieldia malacodactylus (Zeller, 1847)
Merrifieldia tridactyla (Linnaeus, 1758)
Oxyptilus parvidactyla (Haworth, 1811)
Oxyptilus pilosellae (Zeller, 1841)
Paraplatyptilia metzneri (Zeller, 1841)
Platyptilia calodactyla (Denis & Schiffermuller, 1775)
Platyptilia farfarellus (Zeller, 1867)
Pterophorus pentadactyla (Linnaeus, 1758)
Stangeia siceliota (Zeller, 1847)
Stenoptilia aridus (Zeller, 1847)
Stenoptilia bipunctidactyla (Scopoli, 1763)
Stenoptilia coprodactylus (Stainton, 1851)
Stenoptilia graphodactyla (Treitschke, 1833)
Stenoptilia lutescens (Herrich-Schäffer, 1855)
Stenoptilia mannii (Zeller, 1852)
Stenoptilia pterodactyla (Linnaeus, 1761)
Stenoptilia zophodactylus (Duponchel, 1840)

Pyralidae
Aglossa pinguinalis (Linnaeus, 1758)
Ancylosis cinnamomella (Duponchel, 1836)
Ancylosis sareptalla (Herrich-Schäffer, 1861)
Delplanqueia dilutella (Denis & Schiffermuller, 1775)
Endotricha flammealis (Denis & Schiffermuller, 1775)
Ematheudes punctella (Treitschke, 1833)
Ephestia unicolorella Staudinger, 1881
Homoeosoma nimbella (Duponchel, 1837)
Homoeosoma sinuella (Fabricius, 1794)
Hypsopygia costalis (Fabricius, 1775)
Hypsopygia rubidalis (Denis & Schiffermuller, 1775)
Khorassania compositella (Treitschke, 1835)
Oncocera semirubella (Scopoli, 1763)
Pempeliella ornatella (Denis & Schiffermuller, 1775)
Pterothrixidia rufella (Amsel, 1954)
Pyralis farinalis (Linnaeus, 1758)
Pyralis regalis Denis & Schiffermuller, 1775
Selagia argyrella (Denis & Schiffermuller, 1775)
Stemmatophora brunnealis (Treitschke, 1829)
Synaphe punctalis (Fabricius, 1775)

Saturniidae
Aglia tau (Linnaeus, 1758)
Antheraea yamamai (Guerin-Meneville, 1861)
Saturnia pavoniella (Scopoli, 1763)
Saturnia spini (Denis & Schiffermuller, 1775)
Saturnia caecigena (Kupido, 1825)
Saturnia pyri (Denis & Schiffermuller, 1775)

Scythrididae
Enolmis desidella (Lederer, 1855)
Scythris albidella (Stainton, 1867)
Scythris cuspidella (Denis & Schiffermuller, 1775)
Scythris dorycniella (Milliere, 1861)
Scythris hornigii (Zeller, 1855)
Scythris oelandicella Muller-Rutz, 1922
Scythris productella (Zeller, 1839)
Scythris seliniella (Zeller, 1839)
Scythris subseliniella (Heinemann, 1876)

Sesiidae
Bembecia albanensis (Rebel, 1918)
Bembecia ichneumoniformis (Denis & Schiffermuller, 1775)
Bembecia megillaeformis (Hübner, 1813)
Bembecia pavicevici Tosevski, 1989
Bembecia uroceriformis (Treitschke, 1834)
Chamaesphecia alysoniformis (Herrich-Schäffer, 1846)
Chamaesphecia anatolica Schwingenschuss, 1938
Chamaesphecia annellata (Zeller, 1847)
Chamaesphecia astatiformis (Herrich-Schäffer, 1846)
Chamaesphecia bibioniformis (Esper, 1800)
Chamaesphecia chalciformis (Esper, 1804)
Chamaesphecia crassicornis Bartel, 1912
Chamaesphecia doleriformis (Herrich-Schäffer, 1846)
Chamaesphecia dumonti Le Cerf, 1922
Chamaesphecia empiformis (Esper, 1783)
Chamaesphecia euceraeformis (Ochsenheimer, 1816)
Chamaesphecia hungarica (Tomala, 1901)
Chamaesphecia leucopsiformis (Esper, 1800)
Chamaesphecia masariformis (Ochsenheimer, 1808)
Chamaesphecia nigrifrons (Le Cerf, 1911)
Chamaesphecia palustris Kautz, 1927
Chamaesphecia proximata (Staudinger, 1891)
Chamaesphecia schmidtiiformis (Freyer, 1836)
Chamaesphecia tenthrediniformis (Denis & Schiffermuller, 1775)
Chamaesphecia thracica Z. Lastuvka, 1983
Paranthrene diaphana Dalla Torre & Strand, 1925
Paranthrene tabaniformis (Rottemburg, 1775)
Pennisetia hylaeiformis (Laspeyres, 1801)
Pyropteron affinis (Staudinger, 1856)
Pyropteron leucomelaena (Zeller, 1847)
Pyropteron minianiformis (Freyer, 1843)
Pyropteron triannuliformis (Freyer, 1843)
Sesia apiformis (Clerck, 1759)
Synanthedon andrenaeformis (Laspeyres, 1801)
Synanthedon cephiformis (Ochsenheimer, 1808)
Synanthedon conopiformis (Esper, 1782)
Synanthedon culiciformis (Linnaeus, 1758)
Synanthedon formicaeformis (Esper, 1783)
Synanthedon loranthi (Kralicek, 1966)
Synanthedon melliniformis (Laspeyres, 1801)
Synanthedon mesiaeformis (Herrich-Schäffer, 1846)
Synanthedon myopaeformis (Borkhausen, 1789)
Synanthedon spheciformis (Denis & Schiffermuller, 1775)
Synanthedon spuleri (Fuchs, 1908)
Synanthedon stomoxiformis (Hübner, 1790)
Synanthedon tipuliformis (Clerck, 1759)
Synanthedon vespiformis (Linnaeus, 1761)
Tinthia brosiformis (Hübner, 1813)
Tinthia tineiformis (Esper, 1789)

Sphingidae
Acherontia atropos (Linnaeus, 1758)
Agrius convolvuli (Linnaeus, 1758)
Daphnis nerii (Linnaeus, 1758)
Deilephila elpenor (Linnaeus, 1758)
Deilephila porcellus (Linnaeus, 1758)
Hemaris croatica (Esper, 1800)
Hemaris fuciformis (Linnaeus, 1758)
Hemaris tityus (Linnaeus, 1758)
Hyles euphorbiae (Linnaeus, 1758)
Hyles gallii (Rottemburg, 1775)
Hyles livornica (Esper, 1780)
Laothoe populi (Linnaeus, 1758)
Macroglossum stellatarum (Linnaeus, 1758)
Marumba quercus (Denis & Schiffermuller, 1775)
Mimas tiliae (Linnaeus, 1758)
Proserpinus proserpina (Pallas, 1772)
Smerinthus ocellata (Linnaeus, 1758)
Sphinx ligustri Linnaeus, 1758
Sphinx pinastri Linnaeus, 1758

Tineidae
Ateliotum hungaricellum Zeller, 1839
Cephimallota angusticostella (Zeller, 1839)
Eudarcia dalmaticum (Gaedike, 1988)
Eudarcia granulatella (Zeller, 1852)
Euplocamus anthracinalis (Scopoli, 1763)
Euplocamus ophisus (Cramer, 1779)
Lichenotinea pustulatella (Zeller, 1852)
Monopis crocicapitella (Clemens, 1859)
Monopis imella (Hübner, 1813)
Monopis laevigella (Denis & Schiffermuller, 1775)
Monopis obviella (Denis & Schiffermuller, 1775)
Morophaga choragella (Denis & Schiffermuller, 1775)
Nemapogon clematella (Fabricius, 1781)
Nemapogon granella (Linnaeus, 1758)
Nemapogon gravosaellus Petersen, 1957
Nemapogon signatellus Petersen, 1957
Neurothaumasia ankerella (Mann, 1867)
Niditinea fuscella (Linnaeus, 1758)
Niditinea striolella (Matsumura, 1931)
Reisserita relicinella (Herrich-Schäffer, 1853)
Tinea nonimella (Zagulajev, 1955)
Tinea pellionella Linnaeus, 1758
Tinea translucens Meyrick, 1917
Tinea trinotella Thunberg, 1794
Triaxomera fulvimitrella (Sodoffsky, 1830)
Trichophaga tapetzella (Linnaeus, 1758)

Tortricidae
Acleris bergmanniana (Linnaeus, 1758)
Acleris sparsana (Denis & Schiffermuller, 1775)
Acleris variegana (Denis & Schiffermuller, 1775)
Aethes rutilana (Hübner, 1817)
Aethes smeathmanniana (Fabricius, 1781)
Aethes tesserana (Denis & Schiffermuller, 1775)
Agapeta zoegana (Linnaeus, 1767)
Aleimma loeflingiana (Linnaeus, 1758)
Ancylis comptana (Frolich, 1828)
Archips rosana (Linnaeus, 1758)
Bactra lancealana (Hübner, 1799)
Celypha lacunana (Denis & Schiffermuller, 1775)
Celypha striana (Denis & Schiffermuller, 1775)
Ceratoxanthis adriatica Elsner & Jaros, 2003
Clepsis balcanica (Rebel, 1917)
Clepsis senecionana (Hübner, 1819)
Cochylis roseana (Haworth, 1811)
Cydia pomonella (Linnaeus, 1758)
Dichrorampha heegerana (Duponchel, 1843)
Dichrorampha ligulana (Herrich-Schäffer, 1851)
Dichrorampha pentheriana (Rebel, 1917)
Dichrorampha plumbana (Scopoli, 1763)
Eana canescana (Guenee, 1845)
Epagoge grotiana (Fabricius, 1781)
Epinotia pusillana (Peyerimhoff, 1863)
Epinotia thapsiana (Zeller, 1847)
Eucosma cana (Haworth, 1811)
Eudemis profundana (Denis & Schiffermuller, 1775)
Falseuncaria ruficiliana (Haworth, 1811)
Grapholita caecana Schlager, 1847
Grapholita compositella (Fabricius, 1775)
Grapholita orobana Treitschke, 1830
Isotrias hybridana (Hübner, 1817)
Lathronympha strigana (Fabricius, 1775)
Notocelia roborana (Denis & Schiffermuller, 1775)
Olethreutes arcuella (Clerck, 1759)
Paramesia gnomana (Clerck, 1759)
Phiaris stibiana (Guenee, 1845)
Phtheochroa duponchelana (Duponchel, 1843)
Sparganothis pilleriana (Denis & Schiffermüller, 1775)

Urodidae
Wockia asperipunctella (Bruand, 1851)

Yponomeutidae
Kessleria saxifragae (Stainton, 1868)
Kessleria albanica Friese, 1960
Kessleria alpicella (Stainton, 1851)
Yponomeuta plumbella (Denis & Schiffermuller, 1775)
Yponomeuta sedella Treitschke, 1832

Ypsolophidae
Ypsolopha asperella (Linnaeus, 1761)
Ypsolopha dentella (Fabricius, 1775)
Ypsolopha falcella (Denis & Schiffermuller, 1775)
Ypsolopha instabilella (Mann, 1866)
Ypsolopha lucella (Fabricius, 1775)
Ypsolopha parenthesella (Linnaeus, 1761)
Ypsolopha persicella (Fabricius, 1787)
Ypsolopha sequella (Clerck, 1759)
Ypsolopha ustella (Clerck, 1759)

Zygaenidae
Adscita albanica (Naufock, 1926)
Adscita geryon (Hübner, 1813)
Adscita statices (Linnaeus, 1758)
Adscita mannii (Lederer, 1853)
Jordanita chloros (Hübner, 1813)
Jordanita globulariae (Hübner, 1793)
Jordanita graeca (Jordan, 1907)
Jordanita subsolana (Staudinger, 1862)
Jordanita budensis (Ad. & Au. Speyer, 1858)
Jordanita notata (Zeller, 1847)
Rhagades pruni (Denis & Schiffermuller, 1775)
Theresimima ampellophaga (Bayle-Barelle, 1808)
Zygaena carniolica (Scopoli, 1763)
Zygaena brizae (Esper, 1800)
Zygaena laeta (Hübner, 1790)
Zygaena minos (Denis & Schiffermuller, 1775)
Zygaena punctum Ochsenheimer, 1808
Zygaena purpuralis (Brunnich, 1763)
Zygaena angelicae Ochsenheimer, 1808
Zygaena ephialtes (Linnaeus, 1767)
Zygaena exulans (Hohenwarth, 1792)
Zygaena filipendulae (Linnaeus, 1758)
Zygaena lonicerae (Scheven, 1777)
Zygaena loti (Denis & Schiffermuller, 1775)
Zygaena osterodensis Reiss, 1921
Zygaena trifolii (Esper, 1783)
Zygaena viciae (Denis & Schiffermuller, 1775)

References

Serbia
Serbia
Serbia
Lepidoptera
Lepidoptera